This is a list of territorial governors in the 18th century (1701–1800) AD, such as the administrators of colonies, protectorates, or other dependencies. Where applicable, native rulers are also listed.

A dependent territory is normally a territory that does not possess full political independence or sovereignty as a sovereign state yet remains politically outside of the controlling state's integral area. The administrators of uninhabited territories are excluded.

Austria-Hungary
Austria-Hungary Austro-Hungarian colonies

Belgium
Belgium Belgian colonial empire

Britain
Kingdom of Great Britain British colonial empire, English overseas possessions
Monarchs – Prime ministers
Monarchs
Prime ministers

Americas

North America

Bermuda
Governors
Benjamin Bennett, Governor (1701–1713)
Henry Pulleine, Governor (1713–1718)
Benjamin Bennett, Governor (1718–1722)
John Hope, Governor (1722–1727)
John Trimingham, Governor (1727–1728)
John Pitt, Governor (1728–1737)
Andrew Auchinleck, Governor (1737–1738)
Alured Popple, Governor (1738–1744)
Francis Jones, Governor (1744–1747)
William Popple, Governor (1747–1751)
Francis Jones, Governor (1751–1755)
William Popple, Governor (1755–1763)
Francis Jones, Governor (1763–1764)
George James Bruere, Governor (1764–1780)
Thomas Jones, Governor (1780)
George Bruere the younger, Governor (1780–1781)
William Browne, Governor (1782–1788)
Henry Hamilton, Lieutenant governor (1788–1794)
James Crawford, Governor (1794–1796)
Henry Tucker, Governor (1796)
William Campbell, Governor (1796)
Henry Tucker, Governor (1796–1798)
George Beckwith, Governor (1798–1803)

Connecticut Colony
Governors
Fitz-John Winthrop, Governor (1698–1707)
Gurdon Saltonstall, Governor (1708–1724)
Joseph Talcott, Governor (1724–1741)
Jonathan Law, Governor (1741–1750)
Roger Wolcott, Governor (1750–1754)
Thomas Fitch, Governor (1754–1766)
William Pitkin, Governor (1766–1769)
Jonathan Trumbull, Governor (1769–1776)

Province of Carolina
Governors
James Moore, Governor (1700-1703)
Nathaniel Johnson, Governor (1703-1709)
Edward Tynte, Governor (1709-1710)
Robert Gibbes, Governor (1710-1712)
Charles Craven, Governor (1712)
Deputy governors, for the northern Carolina
Henderson Walker, Deputy governor (1699-1703)
Robert Daniell, Deputy governor (1703-1705)
Thomas Cary, Deputy governor (1705-1706)
William Glover, Acting Deputy governor (1706-1708)
Thomas Cary, Deputy governor (1708-1711)

Province of North Carolina
Governors
Edward Hyde, Governor (1712)

Province of South Carolina
Governors
Charles Craven, Governor (1712-1716)

Province of Maryland
Governors 
Nathaniel Blakiston, Governor (1699–1702)
Thomas Tench, Governor (1702–1704)
Phillip Calvert, Governor (1704–1709)
Jesse Wharton, Governor (1709–1714)
John Hart, Governor (1714–1715)
John Seymour, Governor (1715–1720)
Thomas Brooke, Jr., Governor (1720)
William Joseph, Governor (1720–1727)
Thomas Lawrence, Governor (1727–1731)
Samuel Ogle, Governor (1731–1732)
Charles Calvert, 5th Baron Baltimore, Governor (1732–1733)
Samuel Ogle, Governor (1733–1742)
Thomas Bladen, Governor (1742–1746/47 )
Samuel Ogle, Governor (1746/47–1752 )
Captain Charles Calvert, Governor (1752–1753)
Horatio Sharpe, Governor (1753–1769)
Robert Eden, Governor (1769–1776)

Province of Massachusetts Bay
Governors
William Stoughton, Acting Governor (1700–1701)
Governor's Council (1701–1702)
Joseph Dudley, Governor (1702–1715)
vacant
William Tailer, Governor (1711–1715)
Governor's Council (1715)
Joseph Dudley, Governor (1715)
William Tailer, Acting Governor (1715–1716)
Samuel Shute, Governor (1716–1723)
William Dummer, Acting Governor (1723–1728)
William Burnet, Governor (1728–1729)
William Dummer, Acting Governor (1729–1730)
William Tailer, Acting Governor (1730)
Jonathan Belcher, Governor (1730–1741)
vacant
Spencer Phips, Governor (1732–1757)
William Shirley, Governor (1741–1749)
Spencer Phips, Acting Governor (1749–1753)
William Shirley, Governor (1753–1756)
Spencer Phips, Acting Governor (1756–1757)
Governor's Council (1757)
Thomas Pownall, Governor (1757–1760)
Thomas Hutchinson, Acting Governor (1760)
Francis Bernard, Governor (1760–1769)
Thomas Hutchinson, Acting Governor (1769–1771), Governor (1771–1774)
Andrew Oliver, Governor (1771–1774)
vacant
Thomas Gage, Governor (1774–1775)
Thomas Oliver, Governor (1774–1776)

Newfoundland Colony
Lieutenant governors
John Moody (governor), Governor (1714–1717)
Martin Purcell (governor), Governor (1717)
Samuel Gledhill, Governor (1717–1729)
Commodore governors
Henry Osborn, Commodore Governor (1729–1730)
George Clinton, Commodore Governor (1731)
Edward Falkingham, Commodore Governor (1732)
The Viscount Muskerry, Commodore Governor (1733–1734)
FitzRoy Henry Lee, Commodore Governor (1735–1737)
Philip Vanbrugh, Commodore Governor (1738)
Henry Medley, Commodore Governor (1739–1740)
Thomas Smith, Commodore Governor (1741)
John Byng, Commodore Governor (1742)
Thomas Smith, Commodore Governor (1743)
Charles Hardy, Commodore Governor (1744)
Richard Edwards, Commodore Governor (1745)
James Douglas, Commodore Governor (1746)
John Bradstreet, Commodore Governor (1747)
Charles Watson, Commodore Governor (1748)
George Brydges Rodney, Commodore Governor (1749)
Francis William Drake, Commodore Governor (1750–1752)
Hugh Bonfoy, Commodore Governor (1753–1754)
Richard Dorrill, Commodore Governor (1755–1756)
Richard Edwards, Commodore Governor (1757–1759)
James Webb, Commodore Governor (1760)
Thomas Graves, Commodore Governor (1761–1763)
Hugh Palliser, Commodore Governor (1764–1768)
John Byron, Commodore Governor (1769–1771)
Molyneux Shuldham, Commodore Governor (1772–1774)
Robert Duff, Commodore Governor (1775)
John Montagu, Commodore Governor (1776–1778)
Richard Edwards, Commodore Governor (1779–1781)
John Campbell, Commodore Governor (1782–1785)
John Elliot, Commodore Governor (1786–1788)
Mark Milbanke, Commodore Governor (1789–1791)
Richard King, Commodore Governor (1792–1793)
James Wallace, Commodore Governor (1794–1796)
William Waldegrave, Commodore Governor (1797–1799)
Charles Pole, Commodore Governor (1800–1801)

Province of New Hampshire
Governors 
Richard Coote, 1st Earl of Bellomont, Governor (1697–1701/2)
Joseph Dudley, Governor (1702–1716)
Samuel Shute, Governor (1716–1723)
William Burnet, Governor (1729)
Jonathan Belcher, Governor (1729–1741)
Benning Wentworth, Governor (1741–1767)
John Temple, Governor (1762–1774)
John Wentworth, Governor (1766–1775)

Province of New Jersey
Governors 
Andrew Hamilton, Governor (1699–1702)

Colony of Rhode Island and Providence Plantations
Governors 
Samuel Cranston, Governor (1698–1727)
Joseph Jenckes, Governor (1727–1732)
William Wanton, Governor (1732–1733)
John Wanton, Governor (1734–1740)
Richard Ward, Governor (1740–1743)
William Greene, Governor (1743–1745)
Gideon Wanton, Governor (1745–1746)
William Greene, Governor (1746–1747)
Gideon Wanton, Governor (1747–1748)
William Greene, Governor (1748–1755)
Stephen Hopkins, Governor (1755–1757)
William Greene, Governor (1757–1758)
Stephen Hopkins, Governor (1758–1762)
Samuel Ward, Governor (1762–1763)
Stephen Hopkins, Governor (1763–1765)
Samuel Ward, Governor (1765–1767)
Stephen Hopkins, Governor (1767–1768)
Josias Lyndon, Governor (1768–1769)
Joseph Wanton, Governor (1769–1775)
Nicholas Cooke, Governor (1775–1778)

Colony of Virginia
Governors 
George Hamilton, Governor (1698–1737)
Francis Nicholson, Lieutenant Governor (1698–1705)
Edward Nott, Lieutenant Governor (1705–1706)
Edmund Jenings, Acting Governor (1706–1710)
General Robert Hunter, Lieutenant Governor (1707)
Alexander Spotswood, Lieutenant Governor (1710–1722)
Hugh Drysdale, Lieutenant Governor (1722–1726)
Robert Carter, President of the Council (1726–1727)
William Gooch, Lieutenant Governor (1727–1740)
Willem Anne van Keppel, Governor (1737–1754)
James Blair, Acting Governor (1740–1741)
William Gooch, Lieutenant Governor (1741–1749)
Thomas Lee, Acting Governor (1749–1750)
Lewis Burwell I/II, Acting Governor (1750–1751)
Robert Dinwiddie, Lieutenant Governor (1751–1756)
John Campbell, Governor (1756–1759)
Robert Dinwiddie, Lieutenant Governor (1756–1758)
Francis Fauquier, Lieutenant Governor (1758–1768)
Jeffery Amherst, Governor (1759–1768)
John Blair, Sr., Acting Governor (1768)
Norborne Berkeley, Baron de Botetourt, Governor (1768–1770)
William Nelson, Acting Governor (1770–1771)
John Murray, Governor (1771–1775)

Caribbean

Colony of the Bahamas
Governors
Elias Haskett, Governor (1700–1701)
Ellis Lightfoot, Governor (1701–1703)
Edward Birch, Governor (1704)
without British rule: see Republic of Pirates 
Woodes Rogers, Governor (1718–1721)
George Phenney, Governor (1721–1728)
Woodes Rogers, Governor (1729–1732)
Richard Fitzwilliam, Acting Governor (1734–1738)
John Tinker, Governor (1741–1758)
John Gambier, Acting Governor (1758–1760)
William Shirley, Governor (1760–1775)
Montfort Browne, Governor (1775–1776)
John Gambier, Acting Governor (1776–1778)
John Robert Maxwell, Governor (1780–1782)
Spanish occupation (1782–1783)
Andrew de Vau, Acting Governor (1783)
John Robert Maxwell, Governor (1783–1784)
James Edward Powell, Lieutenant governor (1784–1786)
John Brown, Acting Governor (1786–1787)
John Murray, 4th Earl of Dunmore, Governor (1787–1796)
Robert Hunt, Acting Governor (1796–1797)
John Forbes, Lieutenant governor (1797)
William Dowdeswell, Governor (1797–1801)

Barbados
Governors
Ralph Grey, Governor (1697–1701)
John Farmer, Acting Governor (1701–1703)
Bevil Granville, Governor (1703–1706)
Mitford Crow, Governor (1707–1710)
George Lillington, Acting Governor (1710–1711)
Robert Lowther, Governor (1711–1720)
William Sharpe, Acting for  Lowther (1714–1715)
John Frere, Acting Governor (1720–1721)
Samuel Cox, Acting Governor (1721–1722)
Henry Worsley, Governor (1722–1727)
Thomas Catesby Paget, Governor (1727–1731)
James Dotin, Acting Governor (1731)
Walter Chetwynd, Governor (1731–1732)
Emanuel Howe, Governor (1733–1735)
James Dotin, Acting Governor (1735–1737)
Orlando Bridgeman, Governor (1737–1738)
Humphrey Howarth, Governor (1738)
Thomas Gage, Governor (1738–1739)
Robert Byng, Governor (1739–1740)
James Dotin, Acting Governor (1740)
Thomas Robinson, Governor (1742–1747)
Henry Grenville, Governor (1747–1756)
Charles Pinfold, Governor (1756–1766)
Samuel Rous, Acting Governor (1766–1768)
William Spry, Governor (1768–1772)
Samuel Rous, Acting Governor (1772)
Edward Hay, Governor (1772–1779)
John Dotin, Acting Governor (1779–1780)
James Cunninghame, Governor (1780–1782)
John Dotin, Acting Governor (1783–1784)
David Parry, Governor (1784–1793)
William Bishop, Acting Governor (1793–1794)
George Poyntz Ricketts, Governor (1794–1800)
William Bishop, Acting Governor (1800–1801)

Cayman Islands, overseas territory
Chief magistrates
William Cartwright, Chief magistrate (1750–1776)
William Bodden, Chief magistrate (1776–1823)

British Grenada
Governors
George Scott, Governor (1762–1764)

Colony of Jamaica
Governors
William Beeston, Acting Governor (1693–1699), Governor (1699–1702)
William Selwyn, Governor (1702)
Peter Beckford, Acting Governor (1702)
Thomas Handasyde, Acting Governor (1702–1704), Governor (1704–1711)
Archibald Hamilton, Governor (1711–1716)
Peter Heywood, Governor (1716–1718)
Nicholas Lawes, Governor (1718–1722)
Henry Bentinck, Governor (1722–1726)
John Ayscough, Acting Governor (1726–1728)
Robert Hunter, Governor (1728–1734)
John Ayscough, Acting Governor (1734–1735)
John Gregory, Acting Governor (1735)
Henry Cunningham, Governor (1735–1736)
John Gregory, Acting Governor (1736–1738)
Edward Trelawny, Governor (1738–1752)
Charles Knowles, Governor (1752–1756)
Henry Moore, Acting Governor (1756)
George Haldane, Governor (1756–1759)
Henry Moore, Acting Governor (1759–1762)
William Henry Lyttelton, Governor (1762–1766)
Roger Hope Elletson, Governor (1766–1767)
William Trelawny, Governor (1767–1772)
John Dalling, Acting Governor (1772–1774)
Basil Keith, Governor (1774–1777)
John Dalling, Governor (1777–1781)
Archibald Campbell, Acting Governor (1781–1783), Governor (1783–1784)
Alured Clarke, Governor (1784–1790)
Thomas Howard, Governor (1790–1791)
Adam Williamson, Acting Governor (1791–1795)
Alexander Lindsay, Governor (1795–1801)

South America

Falkland Islands
Governors
John McBride, HMS Jason, Governor (1767–1768)
Rayner, Governor (1768–1769)
Anthony Hunt, HMS Tamar, Governor (1769–1770)
George Farmer, Governor (1770)
John Burr, HMS Hound, Governor (1771–1772)
Samuel Wittewrong Clayton, Governor (1773–1776)

Asia

Ceylon – Frederick North, Governor of Ceylon (1798–1805)
Madras – Edward Clive, Governor of Madras (1798–1803)

Australia

New South Wales – 
John Hunter, Governor of New South Wales (1795–1800)
Philip Gidley King, Governor of New South Wales (1800–1806)

British isles
Guernsey, Crown dependency
British monarchs are the Dukes of Normandy
Governors
Charles Churchill, Governor (1706–1714)
Giles Spencer, Governor (1711)
Daniel Harvey, Governor (1715–1732)
Lewis Dollon, Governor (1726)
George Cholmondeley, Governor (1732–1733)
Richard Sutton, Governor (1733–1737)
François de La Rochefoucauld, Governor (1737–1739)
Thomas Fermor, Governor (1739–1742)
Algernon Seymour, Governor (1742–1750)
John Ligonier, Governor (1750–1752)
John West, Governor (1752–1766)
Richard Lyttelton, Governor (1766–1770)
Jeffery Amherst, Governor (1770–1797)
Charles Grey, Governor (1797–1807)
Bailiffs
Edmund Andros, Bailiff (1674–1713)
Jean de Sausmarez, Bailiff (1714–1728)
Josué Le Marchant, Bailiff (1728–1751)
Eleazar Le Marchant, Bailiff (1752–1758)
Samuel Bonamy, Bailiff (1758–1771)
William Le Marchant, Bailiff (1771–1800)
Robert Porrett Le Marchant, Bailiff (1800–1810)

Kingdom of Ireland, effectively a client state of England (to 1706) / Great Britain (1707–1800)
British monarchs are the Monarchs of Ireland
Lord Lieutenant of Ireland
 The Earl of Rochester: 28 December 1700
 The Duke of Ormonde: 19 February 1703
 The Earl of Pembroke: 30 April 1707
 The Earl of Wharton: 4 December 1708
 The Duke of Ormonde: 26 October 1710
 The Duke of Shrewsbury: 22 September 1713
 The Earl of Sunderland: 21 September 1714
 Lords Justices: 6 September 1715
 The Viscount Townshend: 13 February 1717
 The Duke of Bolton: 27 April 1717
 The Duke of Grafton: 18 June 1720
 The Lord Carteret: 6 May 1724
 The Duke of Dorset: 23 June 1730
 The Duke of Devonshire: 9 April 1737
 The Earl of Chesterfield: 8 January 1745
 The Earl of Harrington: 15 November 1746
 The Duke of Dorset: 15 December 1750
 The Duke of Devonshire: 2 April 1755
 The Duke of Bedford: 3 January 1757
 The Earl of Halifax: 3 April 1761
 The Earl of Northumberland: 27 April 1763
 The Viscount Weymouth: 5 June 1765
 The Earl of Hertford: 7 August 1765
 The Earl of Bristol: 16 October 1766 (did not assume office)
 The Viscount Townshend: 19 August 1767
 The Earl Harcourt: 29 October 1772
 The Earl of Buckinghamshire: 7 December 1776
 The Earl of Carlisle: 29 November 1780
 The Duke of Portland: 8 April 1782
 The Earl Temple: 15 August 1782
 The Earl of Northington: 3 May 1783
 The Duke of Rutland: 12 February 1784
 The Marquess of Buckingham: 27 October 1787
 The Earl of Westmorland: 24 October 1789
 The Earl FitzWilliam: 13 December 1794
 The Earl Camden: 13 March 1795
 The Marquess Cornwallis: 14 June 1798

Mediterranean

Gibraltar
Governors
Prince George of Hesse-Darmstadt, Governor (1704–1704)
Henry Nugent, Governor (1704)
John Shrimpton, Governor (1704–1707)
Roger Elliott, Governor (1707–1711)
Thomas Stanwix, Governor (1711–1713)
David Colyear, Governor (1713–1720)
Richard Kane, Governor (1720–1727)
Jasper Clayton, Governor (1727–1730)
Joseph Sabine, Governor (1730–1739)
Francis Columbine, Governor (1739–1740)
William Hargrave, Governor (1740–1748/9)
Humphrey Bland, Governor (1748/9–1754)
Thomas Fowke, Governor (1754–1756)
James O'Hara, Governor (1756–1757)
William Home, Governor (1757–1761)
John Toovey, Acting Governor (1761)
John Parslow, Acting Governor (1761)
Edward Cornwallis, Governor (1761–1776)
John Irwin, Acting Governor (1765–1767)
Robert Boyd, Acting Governor (1776–1777)
George Augustus Eliott, Governor (1777–1790)
Robert Boyd, Acting Governor (1790)
Robert Boyd, Governor (1790–1794)
Henry Clinton, Governor (1794–1795)
Charles Rainsford, Governor (1794–1795)
Charles O'Hara, Governor (1795–1802)

Malta Protectorate
Alexander Ball, Civil Commissioner of Malta (1799–1801)

Courland and Semigallia
Duchy of Courland and Semigallia Couronian colonies

Denmark
Danish West India Company, Denmark–Norway Danish colonial empire
Monarchs

Danish West Indies
Governors of St. Thomas and St. John
Johan Lorensen (1693–1702)
Claus Hansen, Governor (1702–1706)
Joachim Melchior von Holten, Governor (1706–1708)
Diderich Mogensen, Interim Governor (1708–1710)
Mikkel Knudsen Crone, Governor (1710–1716)
Erich Bredal, Governor (1716–1724)
Friderich Moth, Governor (1724–1727)
Hendrich von Suhm, Governor (1727–1733)
Phillip Gardelin, Governor (1733–1736)
Friderich Moth, Governor (1736–1744)
Jacob Schönemann, Governor (1740–1744)
Christian von Schweder, Governor (1744–1747)
Christian Suhm, Governor (1747–1758)
Christian Leberecht von Prøck, Governor general (1756–1766)

Governors of St. Croix
Friderich Moth, Governor of St. Croix (1735–1747)
Gregers Høg Nissen, Chief ad interim of St. Croix (1736–1744)
Paul Lindemark, Chief ad interim of St. Croix (1744–1747)
Jens Hansen, Governor of St. Croix (1747–1751)
Peter Clausen, Governor of St. Croix (1751–1758)

Governors of St. Thomas, St. John, and St. Croix
Christian Leberecht von Prøck, Governor general (1758–1766)
Harrien Felschauer, Governor of St. Thomas & St. John (1758–1760)
Johan Georg von John, Governor of St. Thomas & St. John (1760–1764)
Ditlev Wilhelm Wildthagen, Governor of St. Thomas & St. John (1764)
Peter Gynthelberg, Governor of St. Thomas & St. John (1764–1765)
Ulrich Wilhelm Roepstorff, Governor of St. Thomas & St. John (1765–1766)
Peter Clausen, Governor general (1766–1771)
Jens Nielsen Kragh, Governor of St. Thomas, St. John (1766–1773)
Frederick Moth, Governor general (1770–1772)
Ulrich Wilhelm von Roepstorff, Governor general (1772–1773)
Henrik Ludvig Ernst von Schimmelmann, Governor general (1773)
Thomas de Malleville, Governor of St. Thomas, St. John (1773–1796)
Peter Clausen, Governor general (1773–1784)
Henrik Ludvig Ernst von Schimmelmann, Governor general (1784–1787)
Ernst Frederik von Walterstorff, Governor general (1787–1794)
Wilhelm Anton Lindemann, Governor general (1794–1796)
Thomas de Malleville, Governor general (1796–1799)
Balthazar Frederik Mühlenfels, Governor of St. Thomas, St. John (1796–1800)
Wilhelm Anton Lindemann, Governor general (1799–1801)
Casimir Wilhelm von Scholten, Governor of St. Thomas, St. John (1800–1801)

France
Ancien Régime of France, Kingdom of France (1791–92), French First Republic French colonial empire
Heads of state
Prime ministers

Caribbean

French Grenada

Governors
Jean Le Comte, Governor (1649–1654)
Louis Cacqueray de Valminière, Governor (1654–1658)
Dubuc, Governor (1658)
Jean Faudoas de Cérillac, Governor (1658–1664)
Vincent, Governor (1664–1670)
Louis de Canchy de Lerole, Governor (1671–1674)
Pierre de Sainte-Marthe de Lalande, Governor (1675–1679)
Jacques de Chambly, Governor (1679–1680)
Nicholas de Gabaret, Governor (1680–1689)
Louis Ancelin de Gemostat, Governor (1690–1695)
Jean-Léon Fournier de Carles de Pradine, Governor (1695?–1696?)
De Bellair de Saint-Aignan, Governor (1696–1700)

Mediterranean

French Malta
Claude-Henri Belgrand de Vaubois, Military Governor of Malta (1798–1800)

North America

New France
Governors general (See also)
Louis-Hector de Callière, Governor general (1698–1703)
Philippe de Rigaud Vaudreuil, Governor general (1703–1725)
Charles de la Boische, Marquis de Beauharnois, Governor general (1725–1747)
Roland-Michel Barrin de La Galissonière, Governor general (1747–1749)
Jacques-Pierre de Taffanel de la Jonquière, Marquis de la Jonquière, Governor general (1749–1752)
Michel-Ange Duquesne de Menneville, Governor general (1752–1755)
Pierre François de Rigaud, Marquis de Vaudreuil-Cavagnal, Governor general (1755–1760)

Placentia, Newfoundland
Governors
Joseph de Monic, Governor (1697–1702)
Daniel d'Auger de Subercase, Governor (1702–1706)
Philippe Pastour de Costebelle, Governor (1706–1713)

Oceania

Falkland Islands
Louis Antoine de Bougainville, Governor (1764–1767)

Germany
German Empire German colonial empire

Italy
Italy Italian colonial empire

Japan
Empire of Japan Japanese colonial empire

Netherlands
Dutch Republic, Batavian Republic Dutch colonial empire
Monarchs
Prime ministers

Asia

Dutch East Indies
Governors general
Willem van Outhoorn, Governors general (1691–1704)
Joan van Hoorn, Governors general (1704–1709)
Abraham van Riebeeck, Governors general (1709–1713)
Christoffel van Swoll, Governors general (1713–1718)
Hendrick Zwaardecroon, Governors general (1718–1725)
Mattheus de Haan, Governors general (1725–1729)
Diederik Durven, Governors general (1729–1732)
Dirck van Cloon, Governors general (1732–1735)
Abraham Patras, Governors general (1735–1737)
Adriaan Valckenier, Governors general (1737–1741)
Johannes Thedens, Governors general (1741–1743)
Gustaaf Willem van Imhoff, Governors general (1743–1750)
Jacob Mossel, Governors general (1750–1761)
Petrus Albertus van der Parra, Governors general (1761–1775)
Jeremias van Riemsdijk, Governors general (1775–1777)
Reynier de Klerck, Governors general (1777–1780)
Willem Arnold Alting, Governors general (1780–1796)
Pieter Gerardus van Overstraten, Governors general (1796–1801)

Oman
Yaruba dynasty, Al Said of Oman
Monarchs

Mombasa
Walis
Nasr ibn Abdallah al-Mazru‘i, Wali (1698–1728)
unknown Wali (1729–1735)
Sa‘id al-Hadermi, Wali (1735–1739)
Muhammad ibn Uthman al-Mazru‘i, Wali (1739–1745)
‘Ali ibn Uthman al-Mazru‘i, Wali (1746)

Ottoman Empire
Ottoman Empire Eyalets and Vilayets
Sultans
Grand viziers

Portugal
Kingdom of Portugal Portuguese colonial empire
Monarchs

Africa

Angola – Miguel António de Melo, Governor of Angola (1797–1802)
Portuguese Cape Verde
Governors
António Salgado, Governor (1698–1702)
Jorge Cotrim de Mello, Governor (1702–1702)
Gonçalo de Lemos Mascarenhas, Governor (1702–1707)
Rodrigo de Oliveira da Fonseca, Governor (1707–1710)
José Pinheiro da Câmara, Governor (1710–1715)
Manuel Pereira Calheiros e Araújo, Governor (1715–1715)
Serafim Teixeira Sarmento de Sá, Governor (1715–1719)
Balthasar de Sousa Coutinho, Governor (1719–1720)
António Vieira, Governor (1720–1725)
Francisco Miguel da Nóbrega Vasconcelos, Governor (1726–1728)
Francisco de Oliveira Grans, Governor (1728–1733)
Bento Gomes Coelho, Governor (1733–1737)
José da Fonseca Barbosa, Governor (1736–1738)
 Chamber Senate (1738–1741)
João Zuzarte de Santa Maria, Governor (1741–1751)
António José d'Eça e Faria, Governor (1751–1751)
Luís António da Cunha d'Eça, Governor (1752–1756)
Manuel António de Sousa e Meneses, Governor (1756–1761)
Marcelino Pereira de Ávila, Governor (1761–1761)
António de Barros Bezerra, Governor (1761–1764)
Bartolomeu de Sousa de Brito Tigre, Governor (1764–1766)
João Jácome de Brito Barena Henriques, Governor (1766–1767)
Joaquim Salema Saldanha Lobo, Governor (1768–1777)
António do Vale de Sousa e Meneses, Governor (1777–1781)
Duarte de Melo da Silva Castro de Almeida, Governor (1781–1782)
Francisco de São Simão, Acting Governor (1782–1783)
António Machado de Faria e Maia, Governor (1784–1789)
Francisco José Teixeira Carneiro, Governor (1789–1793)
José da Silva Maldonado d'Eça, Governor (1793–1795)
Marcelino António Bastos, Governor (1796–1802)

Portuguese Moçambique
Governors
Jácome de Morais Sarmento, Governor (1699–1703)
João Fernandes de Almeida, Governor (1703–1706)
Luís de Brito Freire, Governor (1706–1708)
Luís Gonçalves da Câmara, Governor (1708–1712)
João Fernandes de Almeida, Governor (1712–1714)
Francisco de Mascarenhas, Governor (1714–1716)
Francisco de Souto-Maior, Governor (1716–1719)
Francisco de Alarcão e Souto-Maior, Governor (1719–1722)
Álvaro Caetano de Melo e Castro, Governor (1722–1723)
António João Sequeira e Faria, Governor (1723–1726)
António Cardim Fróis, Governor (1726–1730)
António Casco de Melo, Governor (1730–1733)
José Barbosa Leal, Governor (1733–1736)
Nicolau Tolentino de Almeida, Governor (1736–1740)
Lourenço de Noronha, Governor (1740–1743)
Pedro do Rêgo Barreto da Gama e Castro, Governor (1743–1746)
Caetano Correia da Sá, Governor (1746–1750)
Francisco de Melo e Castro, Governor (1750–1752)
Colony of Moçambique, the Zambezi and Sofala
Francisco de Melo e Castro, Governor (1752–1758)
João Manuel de Melo, Governor (1758)
David Marques Pereira, Governor (1758–1759)
Pedro de Saldanha e Albuquerque, Governor (1759–1763)
João Pereira da Silva Barba, Governor (1763–1765)
Baltasar Manuel Pereira do Lago, Governor (1765–1779)
Provisional administration, (1779–1780)
José de Vasconcelos e Almeida, Governor (1780–1781)
Vicente Caetano da Maria e Vasconcelos, Acting Governor (1781–1782)
Pedro de Saldanha e Albuquerque, Governor (1782)
Provisional administration, (1782–1786)
António de Melo e Castro, Governor (1786–1793)
Diogo de Sousa Coutinho, Governor (1793–1797)
Francisco Guedes de Carvalho Meneses da Costa, Governor (1797–1801)

Portuguese São Tomé
Governors
Manuel António Pinheiro da Câmara, Governor (1697–1702)
José Correia de Castro, Governor (1702–1709)
Vicente Dinis Pinheiro, Governor (1709)
French Junta (1709–1715)
Bartolomeu da Costa Ponte, Governor (1715–1716)
Chamber Senate (1716–1717)
António Furtado Mendonça, Governor (1717–1720)
Junta (1720–1722)
José Pinheiro da Câmara, Governor (1722–1727)
Serafim Teixeira Sarmento, Governor (1727–1734)
Lopo de Sousa Coutinho, Governor (1734–1736)
José Caetano Soto Maior, Governor (1736–1741)
António Ferrão de Castelo Branco, Governor (1741)
Chamber Senate (1741–1744)
Francisco Luís da Conceição, Governor (1744)
Francisco de Alva Brandão, Acting Governor (1744–1745)
Francisco Luís das Chagas, Governor (1747–1748)
Chamber Senate (1748–1751)
António Rodrigues Neves, Governor (1751)
Chamber Senate (1751–1753)

Portuguese São Tomé and Príncipe
Governors
Chamber Senate (1753–1755)
Lopo de Sousa Coutinho, Governor (1755)
Chamber Senate (1755–1758)
Luís Henrique da Mota e Mele, Governor (1758–1761)
Chamber Senate (1761–1767)
Lourenço Lôbo de Almeida Palha, Governor (1767–1768)
Chamber Senate (1768–1770)
Vicente Gomes Ferreira, Governor (1770–1778)
João Manuel de Azambuja, Governor (1778–1782)
Cristóvão Xavier de Sá, Governor (1782–1788)
João Resende Tavares Leote, Governor (1788–1797)
Inácio Francisco de Nóbrega Sousa Coutinho, Governor (1797)
Manuel Monteiro de Carvalho, Acting Governor (1797)
Varela Borca, Governor (1797–1798)
Manuel Francisco Joaquim da Mota, Governor (1798–1799)
Francisco Rafael de Castelo de Vide, Governor (1799)
João Baptista de Silva, Governor (1799–1802)

Asia

Portuguese Macau –
D. Cristovao Pereira de Castro, Governor of Macau (1797–1800)
Jose Manuel Pinto, Governor of Macau (1800–1803)

South America

Russia
Russian Empire: Russian colonial empire

Spain
Bourbon Spain Spanish colonial empire
Monarchs
Prime ministers

Spanish Netherlands
Governors
Eugene of Savoy, Governor (1716-1724)
Wirich Philipp von Daun, Governor (1725)
Maria Elisabeth of Austria, Governor (1725-1741)
Friedrich August von Harrach-Rohrau, Governor (1741-1744)
Maria Anna of Austria, Governor (1744)
Charles Alexander of Lorraine, Governor (1744-1780)
Maria Christina of Austria-Lorraine with Albert Casimir of Saxony, Governor (1781-1793)
Charles of Austria-Lorraine, Governor (1793-1794)

Viceroyalty of New Granada – Pedro Mendinueta y Múzquiz, Viceroy of New Granada (1797–1803)
Viceroyalty of New Spain (complete list) —
José Sarmiento de Valladares, Viceroy (1696–1701)
Juan Ortega y Montañés, Viceroy  (1696, 1701–1702)
Francisco Fernández de la Cueva, Viceroy  (1702–1711)
Fernando de Alencastre, Viceroy (1711–1716)
Baltasar de Zúñiga, Viceroy (1716–1722)
Juan de Acuña, Viceroy (1722–1734)
Juan Antonio de Vizarrón y Eguiarreta, archbishop & viceroy (1734–1740)
Pedro de Castro y Figueroa, Viceroy (1740–1741)
Pedro Malo de Villavicencio, President of the Royal Court & interim viceroy (1741–1742)
Pedro Cebrián, Viceroy (1742–1746)
Juan Francisco de Güemes, Viceroy (1746–1755)
Agustin Ahumada y Villalon, Viceroy (1755–1769)
Francisco Antonio de Echávarri, President of the Royal Court and interim viceroy (1760)
Francisco Cajigal de la Vega, interim viceroy (1760)
Joaquín de Montserrat, Viceroy (1760–1766)
Carlos Francisco de Croix, Viceroy (1766–1771)
Antonio María de Bucareli, Viceroy (1771–1779)
Francisco Romá y Rosell, Regent of the Royal Court & interim viceroy (1779)
Martín de Mayorga, interim viceroy (1789–1783)
Matías de Gálvez, Viceroy (1783–1784)
Vicente de Herrera y Rivero, Regent of the Royal Court & Interim Viceroy (1784–1785)
Bernardo de Gálvez, Viceroy (1785–1786)
Eusebio Sánchez Pareja, Regent of the Royal Court & Interim Viceroy (1786–1787)
Alonso Núñez de Haro y Peralta, archbishop & viceroy (1787)
Manuel Antonio Flórez, Viceroy (1787–1789)
Juan Vicente de Güemes, Viceroy (1789–1794)
Miguel de la Grúa Talamanca, Viceroy (1794–1798)
Miguel José de Azanza, Viceroy (1798–1800)
Félix Berenguer de Marquina (1800–1803)

Captaincy General of Cuba – Salvador de Muro y Salazar, Governor of Cuba (1799–1812)
Spanish East Indies – Rafael María de Aguilar y Ponce de León, Governor-General of the Philippines (1793–1806)
Commandancy General of the Provincias Internas – Pedro da Nava, Commandant General of the Interior Provinces (1793–1802)
Viceroyalty of Peru – Ambrosio O'Higgins (1796–1801)
Captaincy General of Chile – Joaquín del Pino y Rozas, Royal Governor of Chile (1799–1801)

Viceroyalty of the Río de la Plata – Gabriel de Avilés, Viceroy of the Río de la Plata (1799–1801)
Falkland Islands
Governors
Felipe Ruíz Puente, Governor (1767–1773)
Domingo Chauria, Governor (1773–1774)
Francisco Gil Lemos, Governor (1774–1777)
Ramón de Carassa, Governor (1777–1779)
Salvador de Medina, Governor (1779–1781)
Jacinto de Altolaguirre, Governor (1781–1783)
Fulgencio Montemayor, Governor (1783–1784)
Augustín Figueroa, Governor (1784–1786)
Pedro de Mesa y Casto, Governor (1786–1787)
Ramón Clairac, Governor (1787–1788)
Pedro de Mesa y Casto, Governor (1788–1789)
Ramón Clairac, Governor (1789–1790)
Juan José de Elizalde, Governor (1790–1791)
Pedro Pablo Sanguinetto, Governor (1791–1792)
Juan José de Elizalde, Governor (1792–1793)
Pedro Pablo Sanguinetto, Governor (1793–1794)
José Aldana Ortega, Governor (1794–1795)
Pedro Pablo Sanguinetto, Governor (1795–1796)
José Aldana Ortega, Governor (1796–1797)
Luis de Medina Torres, Governor (1797–1798)
Francisco Javier de Viana, Governor (1798–1799)
Luis de Medina Torres, Governor (1799–1800)
Francisco Javier de Viana, Governor (1800–1801)

Sweden
Sweden Swedish colonies

United States
United States: United States territorial acquisitions
State of Franklin: unrecognized and unauthorized territory (August 1784 – December 1788)
Col. John Sevier, President/Governor (December 1784 – December 1788)

Territory of the United States South of the River Ohio: organized incorporated territory (May 26, 1790 — June 1, 1796). Became the State of Tennessee.
William Blount, Governor (September 20, 1790 – March 30, 1796) Arrived 10 October 1790.

Territory Northwest of the River Ohio: organized incorporated territory (July 13, 1787 — March 1, 1803). 
Arthur St. Clair, Governor (July 15, 1788 – December 14, 1802)

District of Columbia: 
Board of Commissioners of the Federal City (22 January 1791 – 1 July 1802) 
Thomas Johnson (January 22, 1791–August 23, 1794) 
David Stuart (January 22, 1791-September 12, 1794)
Daniel Carroll (March 4, 1791—May 21, 1795) 
Gustavus Scott (August 23, 1794—December 25, 1800) 
William Thornton (September 12, 1794–July 1, 1802) 
Alexander White (May 21, 1795—July 1, 1802)

Mississippi Territory: organized incorporated territory (April 7, 1798—December 10, 1817)
Governor 
  Winthrop Sargent (18 August 1798 -  7 May 1801) Appointed 7 May 1798, arrived 6 August 1798.

Indiana Territory: organized incorporated territory (July 4, 1800—December 11, 1816)
Governor 
Major General William Henry Harrison, Military governor (January 10, 1801 – December 28, 1812). Harrison was the 9th President of the United States (March 4, 1841 – April 4, 1841)

Notes

References

External links
WorldStatesmen—an online encyclopedia of the leaders of nations and territories

Territorial governors
-18th century
Territorial governors
 Territorial governors